William Marsey (born 29 September 1989) is a British composer. He studied music at the University of Cambridge and composition at the Royal Academy of Music, where he was Manson Fellow. He is also one of three artistic directors of Listenpony, a London-based concert series, record label and commissioning body.

Marsey's piece Belmont Chill (from Dutch Indoor Subjects) for solo piano was nominated for the British Composer Awards in 2018. He also composed music for Hofesh Shechter's East Wall in the same year.

Notable works

Orchestra
The Sea (2019), premiered by the Royal Northern Sinfonia conducted by Lars Vogt
Man with Limp Wrist (2021), for 15 players, commissioned by the Los Angeles Philharmonic

Ensemble
Dances of Travel (2018) for 13 players, premiered by the Royal Academy Manson Ensemble conducted by Oliver Knussen

Voices
The Beauty of Sexuality (2011) for solo voices SATBarB and piano
Austerity Songs (2017) for solo voices SATB and piano (commissioned by Songspiel)

Chamber
Doctor (2016) for saxophone quartet
For Grace, After a Party (2018) for cello and accordion

Multimedia
Be nice to see you (2019) for string quartet and recorded sound

Solo
Dutch Indoor Subjects (2018) for solo piano
A Day in Montpellier (2020) for Sam Lyons

References 

1989 births
Living people
21st-century British composers
Alumni of the Royal Academy of Music